The Polynesian longfinned eel (Anguilla megastoma), also known as the Pacific long-finned eel, is an eel in the family Anguillidae. It was described by Johann Jakob Kaup in 1856. It is a tropical eel found in freshwaters in the Pacific, including Sulawesi, Indonesia; the Society Islands, and Pitcairn. The eels spend most of their lives in freshwater, but migrate to the ocean to breed. Males can reach a maximum total length of 100 centimetres, while females can reach a maximum TL of 165 centimetres and a maximum weight of 9,000 grams.

The Polynesian longfinned eel is commercial in fisheries.

References

Anguillidae
Fish of the Pacific Ocean
Taxa named by Johann Jakob Kaup
Fish described in 1856